The Erewash Museum is a museum in the  town of Ilkeston, Erewash, in Derbyshire, England. The building that houses the museum is named the Dalby House after one of the families who inhabited it, and has served as a school and a private dwelling.

The museum opened in the 1980s, and focuses on the history of the Erewash area, with exhibits covering the Second World War, archaeology, and the Stanton Ironworks.

See also
Listed buildings in Ilkeston

References

External links
 Erewash Museum

Museums in Derbyshire
Local museums in Derbyshire
Ilkeston